"I Believe" is the first single from female Japanese artist, Ayaka. It entered the Oricon charts at the tenth spot and slowly rose to number three, having a total of 236,012 sales. It was used as the drama Rondo's theme song.

Track listing

Cover versions
 Singaporean singer Sing Chew covered the song.
 Eric Martin covered the song in English on his 2008 album Mr. Vocalist.

2006 singles
Ayaka songs
Japanese television drama theme songs
Songs written by Ayaka